Gipuzkoan is a dialect of the Basque language spoken mainly in the central and eastern parts of the province of Gipuzkoa in Basque Country and also in the northernmost part of Navarre. It is a central dialect of Basque according to the traditional dialectal classification of the language based on research carried out by Lucien Bonaparte in the 19th century. He included varieties spoken in the Sakana and Burunda valleys also in the Gipuzkoan dialect, however this approach has been disputed by modern Basque linguists.

Area
Gipuzkoan is spoken not in all of Gipuzkoa but in the area between the Deba River and the River Oiartzun. The strip of Gipuzkoa from Leintz-Gatzaga to Elgoibar is part of the Biscayan (Western) dialect area, and the River Oiartzun flowing past Errenteria outlines the border with the Upper Navarrese dialect. However, borders between Gipuzkoan and High Navarrese are gradually disappearing, as Standard Basque is beginning to blur the differences among traditional dialects, especially for younger Basques.

Features

Some of the features of Gipuzkoan, as perceived by speakers of other dialect, are the following:
 The grapheme , which is highly variable among Basque dialects, is generally  (e.g.  vs).
 The verb for 'to go' is pronounced , as opposed to the general .
 The root ending of nouns  is often interpreted as an article and dropped in indefinite phrases:  vs .
 The postalveolar affricate  (spelled ) replaces the lamino-dental fricative  (spelled ) at the beginning of words. For example:  vs ,  vs .

Variants
Gipuzkoan had four main variants:

 The Beterri variant (from the area surrounding Tolosa, towards San Sebastián).
 The Goierri variant.
 The Urola variant (from Zarautz to Mutriku).
 Navarrese Gipuzkoan (Burunda, Echarri-Aranaz).

Historical role
Gipuzkoan is one of the four dialects known as the literary dialects of Basque (Biscayan, Lapurdian, Souletin and Gipuzkoan). It was used in Basque literature from the 17th century onward, but like Souletin and Biscayan, it had only a minor role because of the Lapurdian dialect's dominance. That was because the centre of Basque literary production was in Labourd from the 16th century to most of the 18th century.

Source of Standard Basque
Gipuzkoan vocabulary was used as the main source for Standard Basque, the standardised dialect of Basque that is used in schools and the media.

See also
Basque dialects
Batua (Standard Basque)
Euskaltzaindia, the Royal Academy of the Basque Language

References

Basque dialects
Gipuzkoa